The 1982 California Secretary of State election was held on November 2, 1982. Democratic incumbent March Fong Eu defeated Republican nominee Gordon W. Duffy with 60.54% of the vote.

Primary elections
Primary elections were held on June 8, 1982.

Democratic primary

Candidates
March Fong Eu, Secretary of State of California 
Kenneth R. Smith
Alice Keyser
Helen Howard

Results

Republican primary

Candidates
Gordon W. Duffy, State Assemblyman 
Glenn Rose
Jacob "Jay" Margosian

Results

General election

Candidates
Major party candidates
March Fong Eu, Democratic
Gordon W. Duffy, Republican

Other candidates
Martin E. Buerger, Libertarian
Alfred W. Smith, American Independent
Milton Shiro Takei, Peace and Freedom

Results

References

1982
Secretary of State
California